The 1981–82 NCAA football bowl games were a series of post-season games played in December 1981 and January 1982 to end the 1981 NCAA Division I-A football season. A total of 16 team-competitive games, and two all-star games, were played. The post-season began with the Independence Bowl on December 12, 1981, and concluded on January 16, 1982, with the season-ending Senior Bowl.

Schedule

References